Ghōr, also spelled Ghowr or Ghur, is one of the thirty-four provinces of Afghanistan. It is located in the western Hindu Kush in central Afghanistan, towards the northwest. The province contains eleven districts, encompassing hundreds of villages, and approximately 764,472 settled people. Firuzkoh (called Chaghcharan until 2014) serves as the capital of the province.

Etymology
The ancient Indo-European, Sogdian gor-/gur- ("mountain"-) is well preserved in all Slavic gor-/gór- (goor-/gur-), e.g.: Gorals, Goran, Goranci, Góra, Gora..., in Iranian languages, e.g.: Gorani language, Guran (Kurdish tribe). The Polish notation using gór- ("ó" stands for a sound between English "oo" and "u") instead of the popular gur- or ghur- preserves the ancient orthography.

History

The inhabitants of Ghor were completely Islamized during the Ghurids era. Before the 12th century, the area was home to Hindus, Buddhists, Zoroastrians, and a small number of Jews. Remains of the oldest settlements discovered by Lithuanian archaeologists in 2007 and 2008 in Ghor date back to 5000 BC. Ruins of a few castles and other defense fortifications were also discovered in the environs of Chaghcharan. A Buddhist monastery hand-carved on the bluff of the river Harirud existed in the first centuries during the prevalence of Buddhism. The artificial caves revealed testimony of the daily life of the Buddhist monks.

Various scholars and historians such as John McLeod attribute the conversion of the Ghauri's to Islam to Mahmud Ghazni after his conquest of Ghor.

Traditional Muslim historians such as Estakhri and Ibn Haukal attest to the existence of the non-Islamic enclave of Ghor before the time of Ghazni, which is attributed to converting its population to Islam.

Minhaju-S-Siraj recorded strife between the non-Muslim and Muslim populations:

According to Minhahu-S Siraj, Amir Suri was captured by Mahmud of Ghazni, made prisoner along with his son, and taken to Ghazni, where Amir Suri died.

In 1011, 1015 and 1020, both Mahmud and Mas'ud I led expeditions into Ghur and established Islam in place of indigenous paganism. After this, Ghur was considered a vassal state of the Ghaznavid empire. During the reign of 'Abd ar Rashi and the usurper Toghrul, Ghur and Gharchistan gained autonomy.

Ghor was also the center of the Ghurid dynasty in the 12th and 13th centuries. The remains of their capital Firozkoh, which was sacked and destroyed by the Mongols in 1222, includes the Minaret of Jam, a UNESCO World Heritage Site.

Karzai and Ghani administrations

In June 2004, hundreds of troops of Abdul Salaam Khan, who had rejected the Afghan government's plan to disarm regional militias, attacked Chaghcharan and took over the city in an afternoon-long siege. Eighteen people were killed or wounded in the fighting, at which point Governor Mohammed Ibrahim fled. Three days later the Afghan government announced that it would not retake Chaghcharan. Khan and Ibrahim began negotiations soon after but reached no agreement. Khan's troops left Chaghcharan on June 23, a day ahead of when an Afghan National Army battalion, led by Lieutenant-General Aminullah Paktiyanai, arrived with the support of about twenty U.S. soldiers.

Taliban administration (2021-present)

In 2021, the Taliban regained control of Ghor after the 2021 Taliban offensive.

Transportation

As of September 2014, Chaghcharan Airport, located at the provincial capital of Chaghcharan, had regularly scheduled flights to Kabul and Herat.

Ghor province has a significant number of female drivers compared to the other provinces.

As of 2013, roads in the province remained largely undeveloped, unpaved and often lacked bridges over rivers.

Economy

Agriculture and animal husbandry are the primary economic activities in Ghor Province. According to the United Nations, many young men were forced to leave the province to find work in Herat or Iran and a small percentage of the population were teachers, government officials, carpet weavers, carpenters and tailors. Over half of the population could not cover their basic needs with their level of income. Opium production had returned to the region following the Taliban's departure as locals attempted to increase their incomes by farming a more economically lucrative crop.

Healthcare

The percentage of households with clean drinking water fell from 14% in 2005 to 9% in 2011.
The percentage of births attended to by a skilled birth attendant fell from 9% in 2005 to 3% in 2011.

Education

The overall literacy rate (6+ years of age) increased from 19% in 2005 to 25% in 2011. The overall net enrolment rate (6–13 years of age) increased from 28% in 2005 to 47% in 2011.

Ghor University that first established as Ghor Higher Education Institute and then promoted to Ghor University has around 500 students with a significant number of girls. There are also some Teacher Training Institutes in the Firuzkoh, Taywara and Lal districts. The number of high schools increased in last the 10 years and attendance in university entrance exams (Kankor) jumped from hundreds to thousands of students. Several agriculture and mechanical schools were also established. There is only one nursing school that trains young female high school graduates for midwifery and nursing that is part of the Ministry of Public Health and run by an NGO in association with Ghor provincial hospital.

Demographics

As of 2020, the total population of Ghor province is about 764,472.

Geography

Ghor occupies the end of the Hindu Kush mountains. Ghor is 2,500 meters above sea level and heavy snowfalls often block many of its rugged passes from November to April. It is also a drought-prone area in the summer.

Districts

Sports

Football, volleyball, basketball, tennis, taekwondo and karate are all official sports of the province.  In July 2010, the Ghor Province cricket team was founded and will represent the province in future domestic tournaments.

See also
 Mandesh
 Hazarajat
 Provinces of Afghanistan

References

Further reading
 The Places in Between by Rory Stewart, 2005, Picador Publishers,

External links
 World Food Programme, Ghor Provincial Profile (accessed 11 February 2013)

 
Buddhism in Afghanistan
Hazarajat
Provinces of Afghanistan
Provinces of the Islamic Republic of Afghanistan